Alfred John Young (April 28, 1946 - December 11, 2022) was a former World Champion Drag Racer and National Hot Rod Association Hall of Famer who competed in professional Bracket racing, and the heads-up categories from Super Street and Super Gas to Super Comp. He taught high school in Seattle, Washington, for 37 years, and is involved with the preparation of classic high performance race cars. After campaigning his 1970 Dodge Challenger for over 25 years, winning the American Hot Rod Association (AHRA) World Championship and numerous other National Hot Rod Association and AHRA titles, he donated his drag racing car to the Museum of History and Industry (MOHAI) in Seattle, Washington, in 2007.  During the majority of his auto racing career, he was sponsored by Ole Bardahl of the Bardahl Company. In 2019, he was inducted into the National Hot Rod Association, Northwest Division, Hall of Fame. He was the first Asian American World Champion race car driver.

Biography 

Young, a Chinese American, grew up in San Francisco, California, the youngest of three children.  His sisters are Janey Young Cheu, and Connie Young Yu.  His father was Col. John C. Young, a Colonel in the United States Army Reserve and businessman, and mother was Mary Lee Young, an artist and art collector.

He is married to Vicki Johnson Young who retired from Seattle Public Schools after teaching Elementary School for over 28 years.  They have two children: Chase Johnson Young and Ashley Victoria Durant, and six grandchildren.

Young graduated from George Washington High School (San Francisco), studied English literature at University of Washington and received a BA in 1968 and MA in 1972.

An Upward Bound tutor/counselor, teacher, and an advocate for the program since 1968.

A founder of one of Seattle's first Alternative schools, the Summit K-12 School, in 1973.  He taught high school for 37 years in the Seattle Public Schools instructing subjects ranging from Auto Shop, Physical Education, Film Study, and Chinese Cooking, as well as Honors courses in History, and college level AP United States Government and Politics, and AP Comparative Government and Politics.

He has been the adviser to school teams that participated in the Chrysler Trouble Shooting contests, YMCA Youth and Government Mock trial competitions, Junior State of America Conventions, and has led high school groups to the South Pacific and Washington D. C. for close up learning.  During his teaching career, he also coached: volleyball, softball, and basketball.  The Seattle Committee for Excellence in Education named him as a nominee for their 1985 award.

Young was given recognition as one of Seattle Public Schools' "Heroes in the Classroom" by Vulcan Inc., Russell Investments, and the Seattle Seahawks at Seahawks Stadium in 2004.   Leaving Roosevelt High School (Seattle, Washington) in 2008, he retired from teaching.

From 2011-18, Al & Vicki have driven over 60,000 miles in their classic 1973 Plymouth Roadrunner Muscle car touring the U.S., Canada, and Europe.
  
In 2014, they completed a 14-country, 45-day, 8,000-mile roadtrip around Europe in the same muscle car. On a repeat touring roadtrip in 2015, Vicki & Al visited 24 countries in 50 days, driving again over 8,000 miles in the Roadrunner (from Amsterdam to Greece, Istanbul, Bulgaria, Sweden). In June/July 2016, they completed an unprecedent 3rd road trip in Europe in their Plymouth Roadrunner driving over 7,000 miles through the United Kingdom, the Atlantic Ocean Road and National Tourist Routes of Norway; and making guest appearances at Brands Hatch and the Power Big Meet classic car events.

A member of the Seattle Kung Fu Club for over 48 years, practicing the traditional Chinese style of Martial arts known as Hung Ga Kuen taught by Sifu John S.S. Leong.

Recently active with the Chinese Historical Society of America (CHSA), narrating the documentary: "Dr. Sun Yat-sen at Liberty's Door." (2011)

A member of the Board of Trustees for the Museum of History and Industry (MOHAI), Seattle, Washington (2012–present)

Currently and still a sponsored race car driver and ambassador for the Bardahl Corporation.

Inducted into the Bardahl Corporation Hall of Fame at an event held at America's Car Museum in 2015.

In 2018, Al was the subject of a documentary film by Rick Quan - "Race: The Al Young Story" ...  https://www.youtube.com/watch?v=KEP4EulNErY

Inducted into the National Hot Rod Association Hall of Fame (NHRA), Northwest Division, 2019.

Inducted into the George Washington High School (San Francisco) Hall of Merit, "Motorsports and Education." May 28, 2019

Racing accomplishments 

Car Craft Magazine "All Star Drag Team" (1983)

Firebird Raceway (Boise, Idaho) Bracketeer All-Star Inductee  (1988)

Twice winner of every major Championship E.T. Drag Race National event in the Pacific Northwest from 1976 to 1996.

A three-time winner of Bremerton Raceway's annual "Day Fire Nationals"

Donated his 1970 Dodge Challenger to the Museum of History and Industry (MOHAI) in Seattle

Winner of the "Long Distance" Award at the "Power Big Meet", Vasteras, Sweden (July, 2014)

Winner (repeat) of the "Long Distance" Award at the "Power Big Meet", Vasteras, Sweden (July, 2015; July 2016)

Winner NHRA Division 6 National Open, receiving (a)The Wally at Bremerton Raceway, 2018

NHRA Hall of Fame, National Hot Rod Association, Northwest Division, 2018

The present: still driving in local Sportsman and Pro ET level drag racing events and working on classic high performance muscle cars.

Publications 
Hemmings Motor News (Sept 2021), article: https://www.hemmings.com/stories/2021/09/08/how-a-slice-of-detroit-muscle-opened-doors-while-traversing-the-planet

Hot Rod (magazine) (February 2018), article: "Road-Trippin' 'Round Europe" ("How to Take the Ultimate Road Trip in Europe") pp. 72–76.

Hot Rod (magazine) "Drag Racing" (May 1988), articles: "How to Win at Drag Racing" – A Champion's Guide to Winning Races – and Sponsors; and "Paying the Way (How to get a sponsor)".

Mopar Action Online: http://www.moparaction.com/2015/10/22/road_trip/

Car Craft Magazine (Dec 1981), p. 50: "The American Way:" (Photo) "Al Young 'doubled" at Spokane, clinching the Super Street event and World Championship titles the same day".

Super Stock & Drag Illustrated (Sept 1984), articles: "Kung Fu Fighter – Al Young applies his martial arts training to bracket racing".

University of Washington Alumni Association: Viewpoints Magazine: "Road Runner" pg. 2, 2008.

References

External links 
 https://nwasianweekly.com/2022/12/remembering-al-young/
 http://www.hotrod.com/articles/travelling-europe-1973-roadrunner/
 http://www.roadkill.com/travelling-through-europe-in-a-1973-roadrunner/
 http://nhra.net/basics/index.html#et
 http://www.bardahl.com
 https://web.archive.org/web/20140221102346/http://www.mohai.org/press-media/press-releases/item/2593-world-championship-drag-racer-al-young-comes-to-mohai-june-22-2013
 https://www.facebook.com/media/set/?set=a.10151502255786966.1073741832.37423026965&type=1 (Al Young presents his Dodge Challenger at MOHAI, Summer 2013)
 https://books.google.com/books/about/The_Asian_American_almanac.html?id=sEYUAQAAIAAI (pg. 58)
 http://chalkboardchampions.org./?s=al+young&submit=Search ("Drag Racing Champion Al Young and Chalkboard Champion Al Young: They Are One and the Same")
 http://www.seeitimagery.com/wordpress/?p=1426  (Al Young at the Museum of History and Industry)
 https://www.youtube.com/watch?v=1aj3xXVxjB4 (Al Young racing his Bardahl Challenger)
 https://web.archive.org/web/20140907173050/http://www.iexaminer.org/2014/09/racecar-driver-al-young-exhibits-vintage-muscle-road-car/
 https://web.archive.org/web/20140917205723/http://www.ballardnewstribune.com/2014/08/25/features/meet-bardahl-sponsored-drag-racing-champion-a
 https://www.nytimes.com/2014/08/03/automobiles/detroit-love-swedish-style.html?_r=0#slideshow/100000003032427/100000003034372
 https://www.reuters.com/news/picture/roll-over-volvo-classic-americana-rolls?articleId=USKCN0PD1GL20150703
 https://lindylecoq.wordpress.com/2016/01/21/the-champ-wpc-alpha-beta-5/
 https://www.youtube.com/watch?v=dT-KWI5Lp0c (interview with Al Young at O'Reilly Auto Parts World of Wheels car show, Chicago, 2017)
 https://www.king5.com/video/news/local/meet-al-young-a-world-champion-drag-racer/281-8018548
 https://www.youtube.com/watch?v=2UTK1AExnvw  (brief interview with Al Young at MOHAI during Smithsonian Day Sept, 2018)
 https://www.youtube.com/watch?v=vKiU0CUSANs (Al Young's National Hot Rod Association Hall of Fame acceptance speech, 2019)
 https://q13fox.com/2019/05/28/chinese-american-wwii-veterans-will-finally-be-awarded-congressional-gold-medals/
 https://www.youtube.com/watch?v=KEP4EulNErY (a Rick Quan documentary: "RACE: the Al Young Story"...22 min.)
 https://www.atlasobscura.com/videos/show-tell-drag-racing-al-young

1946 births
Living people
American people of Chinese descent
Schoolteachers from Washington (state)
Racing drivers from California
Racing drivers from Los Angeles
Racing drivers from Seattle
Sportspeople from Whittier, California
University of Washington College of Arts and Sciences alumni